François Bordes (December 30, 1919 – April 30, 1981), also known by the pen name of Francis Carsac, was a French scientist, geologist, archaeologist, and science fiction writer.

Biography
He was a professor of prehistory and quaternary geology at the Science Faculty of Bordeaux. He decisively renewed the approach of focusing on prehistoric lithic industries, introducing statistical studies in typology and expanding the use of experimental flint knapping.  He was known among archaeologists throughout the world for his ability to replicate ancient stone implements; his technique was showcased in a photo essay in the "Early Man" volume of the Life Nature Library.

He also published many science fiction novels under his pen name. In the USSR the science fiction of Carsac was very popular. He was translated and published into Russian as well as Romanian, Bulgarian, Lithuanian, Latvian, Hungarian, Estonian amongst others. However, no translations into English have existed until 2020, when Pour patrie l’espace was published as The City Among the Stars.

Bibliography

Prehistory
"Principes d'une méthode d'étude des techniques de débitage et de la typologie du Paléolithique ancien et moyen", L'Anthropologie, t. 54 (1950)
A Tale of two caves, Harper and Row, 169 p., (1972)
Typologie du Paléolithique ancien et moyen, Delmas, Publications de l'Institut de Préhistoire de l'Université de Bordeaux, Mémoire n° 1 (1961), réédition CNRS 1988 : 
Leçons sur le Paléolithique, CNRS, 3 vol. (1984)

Science fiction

Novels
Ceux de nulle part (Those of Nowhere) (1954)
Les Robinsons du Cosmos (The Robinsons of the Cosmos) (1955) — A piece of French land is ripped off  from the Earth during a galactic collision and planted on an alien planet.
Terre en fuite (Fleeing Earth) (1960)
Pour patrie l’espace (The City Among the Stars) (1962)
Ce monde est nôtre (This World is Ours) (1962)
La Vermine du Lion (The Lion's Parasites) (1967)
Sur un monde stérile (On a Barren World) (1997; written in 1945)

Short works
"Hachures" (Hatch) (1954)
"Taches de rouille" (Spots of Rust) (1954)
"Genèse" (Genesis) (1958)
"L’Homme qui parlait aux martiens" (The Man Who Spoke With Martians) (1958)
"Le Baiser de la vie" (The Kiss of Life) (1959)
"Sables morts" (Dead Sands) (1959)
"La Revanche des Martiens" (The Revenge of the Martians) (1959)
"Quelle aubaine pour un anthropologue!" (What a Boon for an Anthropologist!) (1959)
"Les pauvres gens" (The Poor Folk) (1959)
"La Voix du loup" (The Voice of the Wolf) (1960)
"Premier Empire" (First Empire) (1960)
"Une fenêtre sur le passé" (A Window on the Past) (1961)
"L’Ancêtre" (The Ancestor) (1962)
"Dans les montagnes du destin" (In the Mountains of Destiny) (1971)
"Le dieu qui vient avec le vent" (The God That Comes With the Wind) (1972)
"Tant on s’ennuie en Utopie" (As You Get Bored in Utopia) (1975)
"L’homme qui voulut être Dieu" (The Man Who Would be God) (1970)
"Les Mains propres" (Clean Hands) (1981)
"Celui qui vint de la grande eau" (One Who Came From the High Water) (1982)

Translations
"Souvenir lointain" (Distant Memory) (1958) (translation of Poul Anderson's "The Long Remembering", 1957)

See also 
 Station François Bordes on the Bordeaux tramway

External links
 François Bordes  at the Internet Speculative Fiction Database
 Short biography from Minnesota State University
 Some of the novels online in Russian

French science fiction writers
20th-century French archaeologists
20th-century French geologists
1919 births
1981 deaths
Prehistorians
20th-century French novelists
20th-century French male writers
French male novelists
French male non-fiction writers